The 2021–22 Mestis season was the 22nd season of Mestis, the second highest level of ice hockey in Finland after Liiga. Therefore, this season there would be 14 teams.

Clubs

Regular season

Rules for classification: 1) Points-per-game; 2) Goal difference; 3) Goals scored; 4) Head-to-head points; 5) Penalty minutes.

Playoffs
Playoffs are being played in four stages. Wild-card round is a best-of-3 series, with the quarter-finals, the semifinals and the final being best-of-7 series. The teams are reseeded after the first two stages, so that the best team by regular season performance to make the quarter-finals and the semifinals faces the worst team in the corresponding stage.

Bracket

Wild-card round

Quarter-finals

Semi-finals

Bronze medal game

Finals

Relegation
The bottom four teams will face the top two teams from Suomi-sarja in a double round-robin format. The four best placed get a place in Mestis for the next season.

Final rankings

References

External links
Mestis
Mestis on eurohockey.com
Mestis on eliteprospects.com

Mestis seasons
Mestis
Mestis
Finland